Thomas Oakley Browning (28 January 1920 – April 1998) was an Australian zoologist and peace activist. He was a research scientist in the field of entomology. After his retirement in 1983, he had the title of Emeritus Professor of Entomology at the Waite campus of the University of Adelaide. He also wrote a number of biographies of former colleagues. He died in Adelaide in April 1998 at the age of 78.

Timeline

Publications
 Browning, T. O., 'Davidson, James (1885-1945), Australian Dictionary of Biography, Vol. 8, Melbourne University Press, Melbourne, 1981, pp. 226–227
 Birch, L. C.; Browning, T. O., 'Herbert George Andrewartha 1907-1992', Historical Records of Australian Science, vol. 9, no. 3, 1993, pp. 258–268.

Research areas
Diapause in crickets
The quantitative study of insect populations
Fruit fly
Population ecology

References

1920 births
1998 deaths
Australian entomologists
People from Maitland, South Australia
20th-century Australian zoologists